Rich and Poor may refer to:
 Un povero ricco, 1983 Italian comedy film
 Rich and Poor (TV series), Iranian TV series
 Economic inequality